Reino de Tormentas (translated: Kingdom of Storms) is the debut album of Argentine Post hardcore band DENY released on September 23, 2011 via Pinhead Records. It was recorded between Juni and September 2011 by Javier Casas the guitarist of Hardcore punk band Nueva Ética at Infire Studios in Buenos Aires. Cover artwork was designed by Marina Fages a musician from Argentina.

The album includes 11 songs. The last song “La Última Vez” contains a hidden-track called “Donde Quiero Estar” which is an acoustic cover song from “Where I Want to Be” written and performed by The Dangerous Summer. All songs except “Donde Quiero Estar” were written by the musicians of the band. All lyrics are written in Spanish language.

Track list

Personnel 
DENY
 Nazareno Gomez Antolini – screamed vocals
 Joaquín Ortega – guitars, clean vocals
 Mateo Sevillano – lead guitars
 Juan Pablo Uberti – bass guitar, clean vocals
 Agustín Dupuis – drums
 Jonthan Perez – keyboards

Production
 Produced, mixed and mastered by Javier Casas
 Executive production by Rulo Coronel and DENY
 Cover artwork design by Marina Fages

References 

2011 albums
Deny (band) albums